Dr. Francisco Soca or Soca is a small city in the Canelones Department of southern Uruguay.

Soca is also the name of the municipality to which the city belongs.

Geography

Location
It is located on the intersection of the old Route 8 (a crescent off the actual Route 8 that runs at this point  to its south) with Route 34 to La Floresta. The stream Arroyo Mosquitos flows along the north and the west limits of the town.

History
On 20 September 1877 the "Pueblo" (village) named Mosquitos was founded here. It was also known as "Santo Tomás de Aquino". It was renamed to "Soca" on 18 April 1928 by the Act of Ley Nº 8.204. On 23 September 1971, its status was elevated to "Ciudad" (city) by the Act of Ley Nº 14.022.

Population
According to the 2011 census, Dr. Francisco Soca had a population of 1,797. In 2010, the Intendencia de Canelones had estimated a population of 3,829 for the municipality during the elections.

 
Source: Instituto Nacional de Estadística de Uruguay

Places of worship
 St. Thomas Aquinas Parish Church (Roman Catholic)
 Soca Chapel, a landmark building by Catalan architect Antoni Bonet i Castellana (Roman Catholic; usually closed)

References

External links
INE map of Dr. Francisco Soca

Populated places in the Canelones Department